Camila Moreno (born July 8, 1985 in Santiago) is a Chilean rock and folk singer-songwriter.

Career 
Between 2006 and 2008 she is part of Caramelitus duo with Tomás Preuss. The group duo composed pop electronical music and received good critics from specialized newspapers.

She became famous after the release of her first album Almismotiempo ("At-the-same-time") in 2009. She was nominated the same year for a Latin Grammy in the Best Alternative Song category for her single "Millones". Her voice, folk style and lyrics have been regarded by many as continuing the legacy of Violeta Parra, widely considered to be the most influential Chilean folklorist. Moreno has been called the "Chilean revelation of organic rock" by Petit Indie.

The album Mala Madre was offered for free on June 4, 2015. It was downloaded 73,500 times over the 24 hours that it was made available on her website, a record in her country. Moreno described the album as a tribute to the different women she admires such as Cecilia Vicuña, Violeta Parra and Gabriela Mistral. In the 2016 edition of the Premios Pulsar; Moreno won the awards for Best Pop Artist, Song of the Year and Album of the Year. She is known for her visually creative music videos.

In February 2019, she revives her duo Caramelitus with Tomás Preuss on the occasion of Womad festival.

During 2019, she presents her new project, Pangea, which includes two new albums, several concerts and the release of a documentary (also named Pangea) directed by Alberto Hayden.

During October and November 2019, during the social crisis, she participates in several improvised concerts and criticized the military repression.

Personal life 
She is the daughter of journalist and director Rodrigo Moreno.

She gave birth to her son in 2017. In 2019 she revealed in an interview she's in a relationship with a woman.

Discography

Solo albums 

 2009 - Almismotiempo
 2010 - Opmeitomsimla
 2012 - Panal
 2015 - Mala madre
 2019 - Pangea
 2019 - Pangea (Vol. 2)
 2021 - Rey

With Caramelitus
 2008 - El Otro Hábitat (EP)

Bootlegs 
 2011 - Partidas, melodías y una canción de cuna

References

External links

Chilean feminists
Chilean songwriters
Feminist musicians
Living people
Rock en Español musicians
1985 births
Chilean LGBT singers
Chilean LGBT songwriters
21st-century Chilean women singers
21st-century Chilean LGBT people
Women in Latin music
LGBT people in Latin music